Filippo Cristiano (Torino 13 March 1987) is a retired Italian rugby union player. His usual position was as a Flanker.

From 2012 to 2016 he played for Zebre.

In 2013 Cristiano was named in the Emerging Italy squad for 2013 IRB Nations Cup.

References

External links 
It's Rugby France Profile
ESPN Profile
All Rugby Profile

Living people
1987 births
Italian rugby union players
Rugby union flankers